Pianengo is a comune (municipality) in the Province of Cremona in the Italian region Lombardy, located about  east of Milan and about  northwest of Cremona.

Pianengo borders the following municipalities: Campagnola Cremasca, Casale Cremasco-Vidolasco, Crema, Ricengo, Sergnano.

Demographic evolution

References

External links
 www.comune.pianengo.cr.it/

Cities and towns in Lombardy